WPNH and WFTN are commercial AM radio stations in Central New Hampshire.  They are licensed to Plymouth (WPNH, 1300 kHz) and Franklin (WFTN 1240 kHz).  The stations are branded as "Oldies 92.9" and simulcast an oldies format. Oldies 92.9's brand of oldies features an unusually deep and vast playlist offering the first generation of rock and roll of the 1960s. Oldies 92.9 also offers select hits from the late '50s and tops out musically into the early to mid '70s. The stations also carry Boston Red Sox during the baseball season. The studios are in Franklin, along with co-owned WPNH-FM, WFTN-FM and WSCY. Prior to the addition of both of their 92.9 FM translators, 1240 WFTN and 1300 WPNH featured programming from Westwood One's "America's Best Music" adult standards format.

WPNH is a Class D station with 5,000 watts days and 88 watts at night, non directional while WFTN is a Class C station with 1,000 watts 24 hours a day.  The stations also can be heard on either of two FM translators, both at 92.9 MHz: W225CB, located in Tilton, New Hampshire, and W225CT also on 92.9 in Plymouth, New Hampshire. WPNH & WFTN are known in the local market as Oldies 92.9 (after the translator frequency for both stations). The station does not stream its signal over the internet.

References

External links
 WFTN data

 WPNH data

 Translator data
 
 
 
 

PNH
Oldies radio stations in the United States
Radio stations established in 1965
Plymouth, New Hampshire
1965 establishments in New Hampshire